George Malcolm-Smith (1901–1984) was an American novelist and jazz musicologist. A 1925 graduate of Trinity College, he hosted a jazz radio program on WTIC-FM in Hartford, Connecticut for many years.

He wrote eight humorous novels, most with "salty pictures by Carl Rose." His first novel was adapted into a Broadway musical in 1945 entitled Are You With It?. The musical was in turn adapted into a 1948 film.

He collected a large number of items related to jazz, which were given to the Watkinson Library at Trinity College after his death as dictated in his will.

Novels
Slightly Perfect (1941)
The Grass is Always Greener (1947)
The Square Peg (1952) [also released as Mugs, Molls and Dr. Harvey in Graphic paperback #104 (1955)]
The Trouble With Fidelity (1957)
If a Body Meet a Body (1959)
The Lady Finger (1962)
Come Out, Come Out (1965)
Dividend of Death (1966).

References

Trinity College (Connecticut) alumni
1901 births
1984 deaths
20th-century American writers
20th-century American male writers
20th-century American musicologists